The University of Oklahoma College of Law is the professional graduate law school of the University of Oklahoma. It is located on the University's campus in Norman, Oklahoma.

The College of Law was founded in 1909 by a resolution of the OU Board of Regents. It opened at the beginning of the next school year in September 1909. The first dean was Professor Julien C. Monnet of George Washington University Law School.

OU College of Law has been named a Best Value Law School for nine consecutive years with a current rank of 10th in the nation; consistently leading the state in Bar Exam passage rates with a 95% passage rate on the most recent exam; being a Top 20 Competition Teams school for five consecutive years with a current rank of No. 2 in the nation; launching the nation’s first-ever law school Digital Initiative to prepare students for success and leadership in the 21st century legal profession, resulting in recognition as a Top 20 Most Innovative Law School and as an Apple Distinguished School; creating joint degree and certificate programs to enhance the J.D. and an online Master of Legal Studies degree.

According to OU Law's 2016 ABA-required disclosures, 83.9% of the Class of 2016 obtained full-time, long-term positions for which bar passage was required (75.5%) or for which a J.D. was an advantage (8.39%) nine months after graduation.

History
The College of Law was founded by Julien C. Monnet in 1909. From its humble beginnings of Dean Monnet, two faculty members, and 47 students, the College of Law has grown to become the pre-eminent legal institution in the state. The College of Law initially shared space in the Science Building before moving to the basement of the Carnegie Building.

In 1914, after student's extensive lobbying, the college moved into its first permanent home, Monnet Hall. The "47,000-square-foot Law Barn," as it was affectionately known, was home to the college for 62 years. As the home of the College of Law, it was witness to many events in Oklahoma (and American) history, including the admission of then-future OU Regent Ada Lois Sipuel Fisher, the first black woman admitted to the College of Law, in 1948.

Despite the additional square footage built onto the rear of Monnet Hall, the Law Center, which the College of Law and its associated entities came to be called in 1971, outgrew the building, forcing a relocation to its current home on Timberdell Road in 1976. Adding the American Indian Law Review to complement the established Oklahoma Law Review, expanding clinical legal education, and generally striving to meet the increasing demands of legal education in the late 20th century caused OU Law to once again outgrow its facilities.

In 1992, a feminist group began a nationwide fundraising campaign and then obtained matching state funds to endow a professorship at the University of Oklahoma College of Law in honor of Hill.[10][37]Conservative Oklahoma state legislators reacted by demanding Hill's resignation from the university, then introducing a bill to prohibit the university from accepting donations from out-of-state residents, and finally attempting to pass legislation to close down the law school.[10] Elmer Zinn Million, a local activist, compared Hill to Lee Harvey Oswald, the assassin of President Kennedy.[10][37] Certain officials at the university attempted to revoke Hill's tenure.[38]After five years of pressure, Hill resigned.[10]The University of Oklahoma Law School defunded the Anita F. Hill professorship in May 1999, without the position having ever been filled.[39] (All citations refer to those on the Anita Hill page.)

Andrew M. Coats Hall 
In October 1999, ground was broken on a $19 million construction and renovation project which ultimately added 80,000 square feet to the facility. Named in honor of then-Dean Andrew M. Coats, the facility features the 58,000-square-foot Donald E. Pray Law Library and the 250-seat Dick Bell Courtroom. The new library features the Chapman Reading room, modeled after the reading room in Monnet Hall, with a parquet floor reminiscent of the floors in the Louvre. The Donald E. Pray Law Library, which is open to the public, boasts the largest law collection, public or private, in the state.

The Dick Bell Courtroom is one of the largest courtrooms in the region, if not the nation, and hosts live trials from the various courts in central Oklahoma. The Bell Courtroom has hosted appellate cases from both the Oklahoma Court of Criminal Appeals (including a death penalty appeal) and the U.S. Court of Appeals for the 10th Circuit, as well as civil trials from the U.S. District Court for the Western District of Oklahoma.

On July 1, 2010, Joseph Harroz became the 12th Dean of the University of Oklahoma College of Law and 7th Director of the OU Law Center. In May 2019, Harroz became interim president of the entire University of Oklahoma and OU law professor Kathleen Guzman was appointed interim dean of the college.

Digital Initiative 
In August 2014, OU Law became the first law school in the nation to launch a college-wide Digital Initiative. OU Law Digital Initiative is built around three core elements:
 the common platform of iPad Pro with Apple Pencil, given to all students at no cost, for hand-writing notes and annotating documents;
 a digital training curriculum that educates OU Law students to use technology for productivity in law school and in practice; and
 the Inasmuch Foundation Collaborative Learning Center, which opened in September 2016, is an 8,000-square-foot space that allows students to become familiar with how technology can be used to collaborate on projects.

In May 2017, OU Law celebrated the Class of 2017's graduation, marking the first year an OU Law class collectively completed the school’s Digital Initiative programming, and making the college the first law school in the nation to do so. In November 2017, OU Law launched the OU Law Center for Technology and Innovation in Practice, formally bringing together and expanding the elements of the college's Digital Initiative. In January 2018,  OU Law was named an Apple Distinguished School for 2017-2019 in recognition of its Digital Initiative.

Academics
OU Law enrolls more than 700 students annually in its Juris Doctor (J.D.), Master of Laws (LL.M.), and Master of Legal Studies (M.L.S.) degree programs. The University of Oklahoma Law Center is home to the Legal Assistant Education Program.

Notable alumni
Notable graduates include former U.S. Senator and former OU President David L. Boren, business executive and former OU President James L. Gallogly, former Oklahoma Governors Frank Keating, Brad Henry, and Leon C. Phillips, Oklahoma State University President V. Burns Hargis, president of Oklahoma City University and former 10th Circuit Judge Robert Harlan Henry, New Mexico Governor Susana Martinez, former Congressman and Under Secretary of Defense for Personnel and Readiness Brad Carson, former Ambassador to Saudi Arabia Robert W. Jordan, Oklahoma Attorney General Michael Hunter, Director of the Oklahoma Administrative Office of the Courts and former Oklahoma Lieutenant Governor Jari Askins, former Mayor of Tulsa Kathy Taylor, Denver Broncos owner Pat Bowlen, civil rights pioneer Ada Lois Sipuel Fisher, and former Oklahoma State Senator Gene Stipe.

Alumni serving in the judiciary include Oklahoma Supreme Court Justices Ben Arnold, David Boren, Orel Busby, Tom Colbert, Richard Darby, Denver Davison, J. Howard Edmondson, Noma Gurich, Brad Henry, Frank Keating, Steven W. Taylor, Ben T. Williams and Patrick Wyrick; Oklahoma Court of Criminal Appeals Judges Robert L. Hudson, Gary Lumpkin, and David B. Lewis; Choctaw tribal judge Rebecca Cryer; and former 10th Circuit Judge Alfred P. Murrah.

Long-time Oklahoma Attorney General Mac Q. Williamson also graduated from the Oklahoma University College of Law.

Employment

According to OU Law's 2016 ABA-required disclosures, 83.9% of the Class of 2016 obtained full-time, long-term positions for which bar passage was required (75.5%) or for which a J.D. was an advantage (8.39%) nine months after graduation. This is above the national average of 75.5% (64.5% bar passage required; 14.1% J.D. Advantage).

Pro bono and public service law

Pro Bono Pledge 
Every year at orientation, OU Law asks every student in the incoming 1L class to sign a voluntary Pro Bono and Public Service Pledge. Students can choose to pledge either 50 hours or 100 hours of pro bono and public service over the course of their law school career. In the current 1L class (Class of 2020), a record 100% of the students signed the Pro Bono and Public Service Pledge and nearly two-thirds of those students pledged 100 hours.

In the 2017-2018 academic year, OU Law students completed a record-breaking 24,024 hours of pro bono and public service.

Legal clinics 
Through the OU College of Law Civil Clinic and Criminal Defense Clinic, students represent clients from Cleveland and McClain counties who would not otherwise be able to afford counsel. Operating under the close supervision of faculty attorneys, student interns face many of the same situations and practice demands they will encounter as attorneys while being directly responsible for representation of clients as licensed legal interns practicing under the Oklahoma Supreme Court Student Practice Rules.

Costs

The total cost of attendance (indicating the cost of tuition and fees) at OU Law for the 2017-2018 academic year is $21,503 for Oklahoma residents and $33,338 for non-residents. In 2021, the cost was raised by $780 to $22,283 for Oklahoma residents and raised $1,380 to $34,718 for non-residents.

Publications
Sooner Lawyer Magazine
Oklahoma Law Review
American Indian Law Review
Oil and Gas, Natural Resources, and Energy Journal (ONEJ)

Notes

External links 
University of Oklahoma College of Law

Law
Law schools in Oklahoma
Educational institutions established in 1909
1909 establishments in Oklahoma